"See My Baby Jive" is a 1973 song by the British glam rock band Wizzard.

Written and produced by Roy Wood, "See My Baby Jive" was the second single by Wood's band and their first to reach number one in the UK Singles Chart, spending four weeks at the top of the chart during May and June 1973. It also reached number one in the Irish IRMA chart and number 5 in the German official singles chart. The song was a #12 hit nationally in Australia, reaching even higher in some regional charts.  The single's label stated 'Vocal Backing - The Suedettes'. It was the sixth best selling UK single in 1973.

ABBA later acknowledged its influence on their first major international hit "Waterloo" the following year. A cover version by Flash Cadillac & the Continental Kids was released in 1977.

Personnel 

 Roy Wood – vocal, electric and acoustic guitars, sitar, cello, bassoon, baritone saxophone, string bass, B-flat bass tuba, trombone, recorders, percussion
 Rick Price – bass guitar, vocals, percussion
 Bill Hunt – piano, harpsichord, French horn, trumpet, flugel horn, tenor horn, bugle, euphonium, E flat tuba, little glass, backing vocals
 Hugh 'H' McDowell – cello and ARP synthesiser
 Nick Pentelow – tenor saxophone, clarinet & flute; bass backing vocals
 Mike Burney – alto, tenor, baritone & synthesized saxes, clarinet & flute
 Keith Smart – drums
 Charlie Grima – drums, congas, percussion

Chart history

Certifications

References

External links
Australian-charts.com

1973 songs
1973 singles
Song recordings produced by Roy Wood
UK Singles Chart number-one singles
Irish Singles Chart number-one singles
Songs written by Roy Wood
Wizzard songs
Song recordings with Wall of Sound arrangements